Sloupnice is a municipality and village in Svitavy District in the Pardubice Region of the Czech Republic. It has about 1,700 inhabitants.

Administrative parts
The municipality is made up of village parts of Dolní Sloupnice and Horní Sloupnice, and hamlets of Končiny 1.díl and Končiny 2.díl.

Etymology
The name "Sloupnice" has been transferred from the name of the eponymous local stream, mentioned first in 1167. The stream's name probably originates from the word slup used for a basket used in fishery. The name Končiny referred to a place located on the edge of the village away from its centre.

Geography
It lies in the Svitavy Uplands.

Dolní Sloupnice and Horní Sloupnice form a linear village around the Sloupnický Stream, along the east-west road connecting towns Ústí nad Orlicí and Vysoké Mýto.

History
Sloupnice was founded during the colonization of this area in the second half of the 13th century. The first written mention of Sloupnice is from 1292, when it was donated to Zbraslav Monastery by King Wenceslaus II. However, the donation was probably cancelled and in the early 14th century, Vítek of Švábenice was documented as the owner.

Since 1572, the large village was divided into two village parts (Horní –"Upper", and Dolní – "Lower") for administrative purposes. In 1924, the two parts became two separate municipalities and in 1976, they were merged again.

From 1 January 2007, Sloupnice is no longer a part of Ústí nad Orlicí District and belongs to Svitavy District.

Sights
The Church of Saint Nicholas is the landmark of Horní Sloupnice. It was originally a Gothic church, first mentioned in 1350 and rebuilt into its current Baroque form in 1712.

The Lutheran church in Dolní Sloupnice was built in 1795.

References

External links

 

Villages in Svitavy District